Kirodi Lal Meena (born 3 November 1951) is an Indian politician. He has been a member of the 8th, 11th, 12th, 13th and 14th Rajasthan Legislative Assembly, 9th and 15th Lok Sabha member, and at present he is a member of Rajya Sabha.

He has been in Bharatiya Janata Party since beginning, however, he briefly left it in 2008 but rejoined it in 2018. He has served as a cabinet minister and held the portfolio of food and civil supplies. He was the only Independent Loksabha MP elected from Rajasthan in 2009 Loksabha elections. He belongs to the Meena community.

Personal life
Meena was born in a farmer family in 1951 in Khohra Mullah teh-mahwa dist-Dausa Rajasthan. He did his schooling at a government school and M.B.B.S. completed in S.P. Medical College, Bikaner, Rajasthan.

Arrest
On 24 December 2017, Meena was arrested along with some of his supporters for attempting to enter a private temple in Sankhwali against the wishes of the community members.

Political career
-84	District President, BJP, Sawai Madhopur
1985-86	State Secretary, Rajasthan, BJP
1985-89,1993–98, 199	Member, Rajasthan Legislative Assembly (four terms)
1985-89	Member, Committee on the Welfare of Scheduled Castes and Scheduled Tribes, Rajasthan Legislative Assembly
1986-88	State President, Bharatiya Janta Yuva Morcha, Rajsthan
1989	Elected to 9th Lok Sabha Sawai Madhopur lok sabha
1989-91	Member, Advisory Committee on Food and Civil Supply
1990 onwards	Member, Indian Parliamentary Group
1990-91	Member, Joint Committee of Lok Sabha on Office of Profit
1993-97	State President, ST Front, BJP
1995-98	District Pramukh, District Council Dausa, Rajasthan
1998-99	State Vice-president, Rajasthan, BJP
1998-2000	National Vice-president, ST Front, BJP
Member, National Council, BJP (four times)
State Executive Committee, BJP (four times)
Member, Wildlife Advisory Board, Rajasthan
1998-2003	Member, Estimate Committee (A)
2003-2008	Cabinet Minister for Food & Supply, Govt. of Rajasthan
2007 - 2008	Chairman, Estimate Committee (B) in Rajasthan State Assembly
2009	Re-elected to 15th Lok Sabha (2nd term) Dausa lok sabha
16 Sep. 2009	Member, Consultative Committee on Water Resources Ministry
31 Aug. 2009	Member, Committee on Personnel, Public Grievances, Law and Justice
Member of Rajasthan legislative assembly 2013-2017
Member of Rajya Sabha since 2018

Positions held

Other positions held

References

External links

People from Sawai Madhopur district
India MPs 2009–2014
1951 births
Living people
Candidates in the 2014 Indian general election
Rajasthan MLAs 2013–2018
National People's Party (India) politicians
Bharatiya Janata Party politicians from Rajasthan
State cabinet ministers of Rajasthan
Lok Sabha members from Rajasthan
India MPs 1989–1991
People from Dausa district
Rajya Sabha members from Rajasthan
Meena people